Pebatjma (or Pebatma) was a Nubian queen dated to the Twenty-fifth Dynasty of Egypt. She was the wife of King Kashta. She is mentioned on a statue of her daughter Amenirdis I, now in Cairo (42198). She is also mentioned on a doorjamb from Abydos.

Family
Pebatjma was the wife of King Kashta. Several children and possible children are recorded:
 King Piye - Thought to be a son of Kashta and thus possibly a son of Pebatjma
 King Shabaka - Mentioned as a brother of Amenirdis I, and hence a son of Kashta and Pebatjma.
 Queen Khensa - Wife of Piye, thought to be a daughter of Kashta and possibly Pebatjma.
 Queen Peksater (or Pekareslo) - She was married to Piye and was buried in Abydos. She may have died while accompanying Piye on a campaign to Egypt. Laming and Macadam suggest she was an adopted daughter of Pebatjma.
 God's Wife of Amun Amenirdis I. A statue of Amenirdis mentions she is the daughter of Kashta and Pebatjma.
 Neferukakashta - Thought to be a daughter of Kashta and possibly Pebatjma.

Possible identification with Pabtamer

It is possible but by no means certain that Pebatjma is identical to a royal woman named Pabtamer (Pa-abt-ta-mer). A stela from Abydos belonging to a general named Paqattereru (Pekatror) records how this general was called upon by Osiris for the burial of his mother Pabtamer who had the beautiful name Meres-Nip ("beloved of Napata" or "She who loves Napata"). She holds the titles Chantress of Amun, King's Sister, King's daughter, and Mother of the Adorer of the God. It has been suggested that Pa-abt-ta-mer is an Egyptianization of the name Pebatjma. The problem with the identification is that Pa-abt-ta-mer holds slightly different titles than those recorded for Pebatjma on other monuments. Furthermore, the title of King's daughter is slightly problematic as there is no known king who could be her father. Paqattereru is not a King's son, and these facts may point to Pa-abt-ta-mer being an otherwise unknown wife of either Piye or Taharqa, and the mother of either Shepenupet II or Amenirdis II.

References

8th-century BC Egyptian women
Queens consort of the Twenty-fifth Dynasty of Egypt
8th-century BC Egyptian people